Białe wakacje released in 2002 was third studio album of Polish rock group Ścianka.

Track listing
 "Got my shoes and my tattoo part 1" – 2:38
 "Białe wakacje" – 7:33 (White holiday)
 "The hill" – 2:14 
 "Harfa traw" – 4:39 (The harp of the grasses)
 "Piosenka nr.2" – 7:02 (Song number 2)
 "A-6" – 1:33
 "Miasta i nieba" – 7:37 (Citys and skies)
 "Peron 4" – 7:15 (Platform 4)
 "September" – 5:20 
 "Got my shoes and my tattoo part 2" – 12:50

Personnel 

 Maciej Cieślak – guitar, vocals
 Arkadiusz Kowalczyk – drums
Jacek Lachowicz – synthesizers
Andrzej Koczan – bass guitar

Ścianka albums
2002 albums